Susie Barstow Skelding (1857-1934), was an American illustrator who produced several popular series of books in which her illustrations were paired with poetry by well-known authors.

Biography
Susie Barstow Skelding was the daughter of Ann Marie Barstow and James Augustus Skelding and the niece of the landscape painter Susie M. Barstow. She was a member of the Brooklyn Art Club. 

In the 1880s, she produced several series of books in which her full-color illustrations of flowers accompanied her selections of poetry by various authors, including John Greenleaf Whittier, Julia Ward Howe, Alice Wellington Rollins, Helen Hunt Jackson, Celia Thaxter, James G. Percival, William Dean Howells, Mary Mapes Dodge, and Elaine Goodale. 

The popular "Flower Songs" series is perhaps the best known of these. In some cases, the books' color plates included  handwritten poems framed by Skelding's floral designs. A number of the books she produced, such as Songsters of the Branches, were ribbon-bound.

Skelding also chose the poems for a series of books featuring birds; these were illustrated by the artist Fidelia Bridges.

Books
'Seasons' series
Spring Blossoms (1885)
Midsummer Flowers (1885)
Flowers for Winter Days (1885)

'Flowers from' series
Flowers from Hilly Dale (1883)
Flowers from Here and There (1885)
Flowers from Dell and Bower (1886)
Flowers from Sunlight and Shade
Flowers from Glade and Garden

"Flower Songs" series
Songs of Flowers''' (I; ca. 1883)A Handful of Blossoms (II; ca. 1883)Maple Leave and Golden Rod (III)From Moor and Glen (IV)A Bunch of Roses (V)Pansies and Orchids (VI; 1884)Roses and Foreget-Me-Nots (VII; 1884)Heartsease (VIII)Wayside Flowers (IX)

Books illustrated by Fidelia BridgesBirds of Meadow and Grove (1886)Songsters of the Branches (1886)Birds and Blossoms and What the Poets Sing of Them (1887)Winged Flower Lovers (1888)Harbingers of Spring (1888)Familiar Birds and What the Poets Sing of Them (1886)

Other booksEaster Flowers (1883)Easter Bells (1885)Bits of Distant Land and Sea (ca. 1888)Under Italian Skies (1888)From Snow to Sunshine (1889; by Alice Wellington Rollins)Birthday Flowers'' (1891)

References

1857 births
1934 deaths
American women illustrators
American illustrators
19th-century American women artists
Botanical illustrators